The 2012 Russian Artistic Gymnastics Championships were held in Penza, Russia in March for WAG.

Medal winners 

2010 world all-around champion Aliya Mustafina continued her impressive comeback at the Russian championships, leading her Moscow team to first place in the team final in Penza. .

External links

References

2012 in gymnastics
Artistic Gymnastics Championships
Russian Artistic Gymnastics Championships
March 2012 sports events in Russia